Mahlon Norris Gilbert (March 23, 1848 – March 2, 1900) was coadjutor bishop of the Episcopal Diocese of Minnesota from 1886 to 1900 during the diocesan tenure of Henry Benjamin Whipple.

Early life and education
Gilbert was born on March 23, 1848, in Morris, New York, the son of Norris Gilbert and Lucy Todd. He received his early education at the Fairfield Academy, and then at Hobart College in 1866. Due to poor health, he left college prior to the completion of his course, and moved to Florida for the benefit of his health. Some time later, he took charge of the Good Shepherd School in Ogden, Utah. He also enrolled at the Seabury-Western Theological Seminary in 1872, and graduated with a Bachelor of Divinity in 1875.  He was awarded a Doctor of Divinity from Seabury and Hobart College, respectively, and a Doctor of Sacred Theology from Racine College.

Ordained Ministry
Gilbert was ordained deacon on June 20, 1875, by Bishop Henry Benjamin Whipple of Minnesota in the Cathedral of Our Merciful Saviour, and was then given charge of a mission in Deer Lodge, Montana. He was ordained priest on October 17, 1875, by Bishop Daniel S. Tuttle in St James' Church, Deer Lodge, Montana, after which he continued with his mission work in Montana. In 1881, he became rector of Christ Church in Saint Paul, Minnesota, where he remained till 1886.

Bishop
In 1886, Gilbert was elected Coadjutor Bishop of Minnesota, and was consecrated on October 17, 1886, by Presiding Bishop Alfred Lee, in St James' Church, Chicago. He never succeeded as diocesan, as he died on March 2, 1900, in Saint Paul, Minnesota.

Linage
2. Norris Gilbert, 1811–1877. Lucy Todd, 1813–1891.

3. Elijah Gilbert, 1775–1862. Lois Ward, 1773–1856.

4. Ambrose Ward, 1747–1819. Lois Meigs, 1750–1826.

5. Jonathan Meigs, ....-1765.

6. Capt. Jonathan Meigs, 1672–1739. Hannah Willard, 1698-...

7. Josiah Willard -1674. Hannah Hosmer -....

8. Major Simon Willard, 1605–1676. Mary Sharpe, -

Seventh in descent from Major Simon Willard of Concord and Charlestown, Mass.

References

External links 
Bibliographic directory from Project Canterbury
 Reference: SOCIETY OF COLONIAL WARS, In the State of Minnesota. Register of members and Ancestors. 1901. Contributor Cornell University Library  https://archive.org/details/cu31924030920122

1848 births
1900 deaths
19th-century American Episcopalians
Episcopal bishops of Minnesota
19th-century American clergy